The 9ff GT9 is a sports car based loosely on the Porsche 911, built by German tuning company 9ff, founded by Jan Fatthauer. Based on the Porsche 911 (997) GT3; the cars are extensively rebuilt and fitted with a heavily modified 3.6-4.0 litre flat 6 engine that produces , depending on the configuration. One of the major differences from a normal 911 is the positioning of the engine; whilst every 911 throughout Porsche's history (excluding the Porsche 911 GT1 race car) has been rear-engined, the GT9 is mid-engined for better weight distribution.

It takes the 9ff 3.8 seconds (from a rolling start) or 4.2 seconds (from a standing start) to reach , and 17.6 seconds to reach . This was faster than the original Bugatti Veyron, but slower than both the SSC Ultimate Aero TT and the Bugatti Veyron Super Sport.

The interior of the car has been stripped out for lightness and thus was very basic compared to a standard 911 GT3. All GT9s had blue leather, square-patterned interior trim, with a roll cage for safety. A carbon fibre and Kevlar construction helps further in weight savings.

9ff stated that only 150 GT9s would be produced, and only 20 of those would have the most powerful engine. Prices ranged between £150,000 and £540,000 depending on engine and options, with all of them already sold by the time the car was launched in the market.

9ff GT9-R

It accelerates from 0– in 2.9s and 0– in under 16s. Only 20 examples of the GT9-R were produced.

9ff GT9-CS

At the 2011 Essen Motor Show, 9ff brought out the third version of the car, the GT9-CS, built as a one-off. This car used the Stage 1 3.6L twin-turbocharged flat-6 engine, thus producing , and was designed specifically as a track-day car. A further  of weight was removed from the car, and several changes were made - a new rear wing, front splitter, and revised air intakes.

9ff GT9 Vmax

At the 2012 Essen Motor Show, 9ff revealed their new Vmax variant of the GT9 which produced  and 855 lb-ft (1,160 Nm) of torque from a 4.2-liter twin-turbocharged flat-six. At the time of release, this variant cost €895,000.

References

9ff GT9-R